Fu Yung Pit is mountain located in northeastern Kowloon, Hong Kong, with a height of  above sea level.

See also
 List of mountains, peaks and hills in Hong Kong

References